Yang Jun (Chinese:杨君 Pinyin: Yáng Jūn; born 10 June 1981 in Tianjin) is a Chinese footballer.

Club career
Yang Jun was considered an outstanding young talented goalkeeper and was quickly spotted by the Chinese youth system before top tier side Qingdao Yizhong Hainiu took him into their side and promoted him into their senior side by the 2001 league season. At Qingdao, who had changed their name to Qingdao Jonoon, he would not have to wait long before he would establish himself as a team regular by the end of the 2002 league season when he made twenty league appearances at the end of the season. For the next several seasons, he was the club's first choice goalkeeper until he was willing to join high flying second tier club Changchun Yatai and immediately win promotion for them, however he was unable to establish himself within the team and was loaned out to Beijing Guoan but the subsequent move was unsuccessful and he only played four games for them.

Changchun Yatai were willing to let Yang Jun go and he would transfer to top tier side Tianjin Teda at the beginning of the 2007 league season where he was immediately chosen as the club's first choice goalkeeper as well as quickly becoming a prominent member of the team. The next season would see him have his most successful season with the club when in the 2008 league season he would aid the club to a top four finish and qualification for the AFC Champions League for the first time. The 2009 AFC Champions League was not successful for the club and while he played in the first four games of the groups stages he was rested for the remaining two after the team could not progress, however Yang still played in every league game throughout the season and even captained the team during absence of club captain Wang Xiao for a short period. At the end of the season the team finished in a disappointing sixth and the club were willing to let Yang go, however they could not find a buyer and as with his teammate Han Yanming the club stopped paying his wages so Yang went to his old club Tianjin Locomotive to train on his fitness. Yang later signed for Guangzhou Evergrande before the 2011 season.

Yang played understudy to Li Shuai in the first half of 2011 season. On 12 May 2011, Yang made his debut for Guangzhou Evergrande in the second round of 2011 Chinese FA Cup as a substitute for Li Shuai in the final minutes, hoping to make impress in the penalty shootout. However, Guangzhou finally lost to Shaanxi Renhe 12–11. Yang gained his Super League debut on 29 May 2011 after Li Shuai suffered injury in the match against Changchun Yatai. He performed well during Li Shuai's absence and when the Li returned from injury, Yang kept his place for Guangzhou Evergrande and helped the club win their first Super League champions in the 2011 season. His position was threaten by Li Shuai after Italian manager Marcello Lippi took charge the club. He became the second choice goalkeeper in September 2012 and the third choice goalkeeper in the 2013 season after Chinese international Zeng Cheng joined the club.

In February 2014, Yang transferred to China League One side Shenyang Zhongze on a free transfer. In February 2015, Yang moved to another League One club Tianjin Songjiang after Shenyang Zhongze dissolved.

International career
Yang won his first cap for Chinese national team on 7 December 2002, in an international friendly against Syria. He was selected for the Chinese national team in the 2007 AFC Asian Cup where he played understudy to Li Leilei. He played one game in the tournament for China in 2007 against Uzbekistan which China lost 3–0, effectively knocking China out of the tournament.

Career statistics
Statistics accurate as of match played 11 November 2018

Honours
Qingdao Jonoon
Chinese FA Cup: 2002

Guangzhou Evergrande
Chinese Super League: 2011, 2012, 2013
Chinese FA Cup: 2012
Chinese FA Super Cup: 2012
AFC Champions League: 2013

Tianjin Quanjian F.C.
China League One: 2016

References

External links

Player profile at Sodasoccer.com
Player stats at Football-lineups.com
Player stats at Sohu.com

1981 births
Living people
Association football goalkeepers
Chinese footballers
Footballers from Tianjin
China international footballers
2007 AFC Asian Cup players
Qingdao Hainiu F.C. (1990) players
Changchun Yatai F.C. players
Beijing Guoan F.C. players
Tianjin Jinmen Tiger F.C. players
Guangzhou F.C. players
Tianjin Tianhai F.C. players
Chinese Super League players
China League One players
Footballers at the 2002 Asian Games
Asian Games competitors for China